Jackie Edwards may refer to:

 Jackie Edwards (musician) (1938–1992), Jamaican male musician and songwriter
 Jackie Edwards (athlete) (born 1971), Bahamian female long jumper

See also
Jack Edwards (disambiguation)
John Edwards (disambiguation)